Kincheloe may refer to:

Places 
In the United States:
 Kincheloe Air Force Base, a former U.S. Air Force Base in the Upper Peninsula of Michigan
 Kincheloe, Michigan, an unincorporated community near the former Air Force Base
 Kincheloe, West Virginia, an unincorporated community
 Kincheloe Creek, a creek in West Virginia

People 
Kincheloe (surname)